A familect is a set of invented words or phrases with meanings understood within members of a family or other small intimate group. Among the pioneers of research on familects is Cynthia Gordon, professor of linguistics at Georgetown University and discussed in her 2009 book Making Meanings, Creating Family. Familects fall within the intimate register of communication. Familects gain vocabulary through the words young children create as they learn to talk, when these words are adopted by the family. Familects also gain vocabulary through slips of the tongue and word invention.

See also
 Idioglossia

References

Further reading

External links

 Georgetown University Linguistics faculty page, with info on Cynthia Gordon
 Kitchen Table Lingo, The English Project
 Mignon Fogarty, What's Your Family Slang, Quick and Dirty Tips

Diglossia
Sociolinguistics